Donald G. Jackson  (April 24, 1943 – October 20, 2003) was an American filmmaker.

Biography
Born in Tremont, Mississippi, Jackson grew up in Adrian, Michigan.  As an adult he struggled to become a filmmaker for many years while working at an auto factory.  Finally, in the mid-1970s he made his first feature film, a horror film parody, The Demon Lover. This film was soon followed by the wrestling film, I Like to Hurt People. These films financed his move to Hollywood, California, where he remained until his death. Jackson is perhaps most well known for creating and directing the cult film, Hell Comes to Frogtown.

Throughout his career Jackson worked with several filmmakers including Roger Corman and James Cameron but it was not until he began a long collaboration with American filmmaker Scott Shaw that the team created Zen Filmmaking.  Zen Filmmaking is a distinct style of filmmaking where no scripts are used in the creation of a film. Actors who frequently starred in Jackson's films included Joe Estevez and Robert Z'Dar.

Death
Jackson died of leukemia on October 20, 2003 and was interred in the Westwood Village Memorial Park Cemetery in Los Angeles.

Filmography 
 The Demon Lover (1976)
 I Like to Hurt People (1985)
 Roller Blade (1986)
 UFO: Secret Video (1986)
 Hell Comes to Frogtown (1987)
 Roller Blade Warriors: Taken by Force (1990)
 The Roller Blade Seven (1991)
 The Legend of the Rollerblade Seven (1992)
 Carjack (1993)
 Return to Frogtown (1993)
 It's Showtime (1993)
 Return of the Roller Blade Seven (1993)
 Pocket Ninjas (1994)
 Queen of Lost Island (1994)
 The Devil's Pet (1994)
 Twisted Fate (1994)
 Kill, Kill Overkill (1994)
 Baby Ghost (1995)
 Little Lost Sea Serpent (1995)
 Big Sister 2000 (1995)
 Raw Energy (1995)
 Rollergator (1996)
 Toad Warrior (1996)
 Guns of El Chupacabra (1997)
 Armageddon Boulevard (1998)
 Lingerie Kickboxer (1998)
 Guns of El Chupacabra 2: The Unseen (1999)
 Blade Sisters (1999)
 Ride with the Devil (1999)
 Legend of the Dead Boyz (2001)
 Max Hell Frog Warrior (2002)

Documentary films about Donald G. Jackson 

Demon Lover Diary (1980)
Interview: The Documentary (2005)

References

External links 

Collection of articles about Donald G. Jackson
Donald G. Jackson - The Final Interview
RiffTrax treatment of Rollergator  on official YouTube channel

Deaths from leukemia
1943 births
2003 deaths
People from Adrian, Michigan
Deaths from cancer in California
Film directors from Michigan
Burials at Westwood Village Memorial Park Cemetery
People from Itawamba County, Mississippi